The Parliament of La Rioja (Spanish: Parlamento de La Rioja) is the unicameral autonomous parliament of La Rioja, one of the autonomous communities of Spain. The parliament, composed of 33 elected seats, is located the former Monastery of La Merced in Logroño, the capital city of La Rioja.

See also
List of presidents of the Parliament of La Rioja

References

 
1982 establishments in La Rioja (Spain)
Rioja